Crocotania crocota is a species of moth of the family Tortricidae. It is found in Brazil (Distrito Federal).

References

External links

Moths described in 2003
Endemic fauna of Brazil
Euliini
Moths of South America
Taxa named by Józef Razowski